The Trouble with the Truth may refer to:

The Trouble with the Truth (album), 1996 album by Patty Loveless
"The Trouble with the Truth" (song), a 1997 song written by Gary Nicholson and recorded by Patty Loveless
The Trouble with the Truth (film), a 2011 American romantic drama film